Dostoevsky Omsk State University (Омский государственный университет им. Ф. М. Достоевского), usually referred to as Omsk State University (Омский государственный университет) (OmSU) was founded in 1974 in the city of Omsk, Russia. The two original departments (Humanities and Science) and 40 professors have grown to 13 departments and a 1000-member faculty. The university has graduated more than 25,000 students. OmSU embraces its connections to the world and develops international relations with the universities of Europe, the United States, Mexico, Japan, China, Kazakhstan and other countries. Such cooperation led to the establishment of the Centers for Chinese, Kazakh and Ibero-American Studies which in its turn flows into the development of study and research abroad programs that provide the opportunity to conduct independent projects in a foreign country.

Faculties
The university has 12 faculties and two institutes:

Faculty of Computer Science
Faculty of Economics
Faculty of Law
Faculty of Culture and Arts
Faculty of Psychology
Faculty of Theology, Philosophy and World Cultures
Faculty of Chemistry
Faculty of Physics
Faculty of History
Faculty of Foreign Languages
Faculty of Physical Education, Rehabilitation and Sport
Faculty of Philology and Media Communications
Institute of Mathematics and Information Technology
Institute of Secondary Vocational Education and Pre-University Training

As well as 6 training centers:

Faculty of advanced training
Center for Business Education
Preparatory department for foreign citizens
Center for pre-university training and career guidance
Center for Advanced Studies "Secret-Inform"
Institute of Continuing and Open Education

Accommodation
The university has eleven main buildings. Among these are two nine-story dormitory towers, mostly with  two or three students sharing a room. These dormitories possess laundry facilities, pay phones, TV lounges and game rooms. Self-catering rooms provide facilities for communal cooking and dining.

The campus includes photocopy offices, a book store, libraries, learning rooms, 22 university laboratories with special equipment, a health center, a playground, two gyms, cafeterias and canteens, a large conference hall.

The library maintains subscriptions to many subject-specific periodicals as well as to daily and weekly newspapers both from Russia and from abroad. Study rooms are included on the library's premises and computer labs in areas designated by each department are widely used by both students and faculty to read for classes and exams, to write articles, essays and coursework, and to rehearse presentations. Networked computers provide free Internet and e-mail access.

Studies

The university operates degree programs not only in law, humanities and natural sciences but also in theology, culture and arts, including:

53 undergraduate degree courses
31 master programs
15 postgraduate programs 
8 PhD programs

In 2013, the Interuniversity Innovation Business Incubator was created to offer aspiring scientists research opportunities. As well as full-time courses, the university offers 10-month Russian language group courses.

Most courses are taught in Russian, but some courses can be taught in English, German, French and Spanish if requested. The university offers summer and winter schools for students to develop and improve their Russian language skills. The schools also have a large cultural element, with trips to local sites such as the Ebeyty Salt Lake and Vrubel Museum of Fine Arts.

The university works in partnership with several organisations, working to assist students with work experience and employment during and after their studies. To mention a few, these include: Gazprom, Sberbank, Cisco, Microsoft and Unilever.

Students can join a variety of sporting clubs, such as football and hockey. They also have access to a swimming pool, on-site and off-site recreation centres, athletic fields and fitness studios. The university is also a part of the Erasmus+ programme, offering students the opportunity to study abroad as part of their studies.

The university publishes several newspapers, giving insight into campus life and keeps students informed about social and sports events. Both students and faculty contribute to the papers.

The Publishing Department and the Scientific-Educational Fund (NOF) both publish research and literature. NOF is in charge of organising preparatory courses and administering tests for high school students and applicants.

University publications
Herald of Omsk University (Вестник ОмГУ) - journal
Historical Yearbook (Исторический ежегодник) - journal 
Omsk University (Омский университет) - newspaper
Wellspring (Источник) – a publication for Orthodox students
Eagle-owl (Филин) – a publication of the Department of Philology
Pilgrim (Пилигрим) – literary journal

Notable alumni and faculty
Sergey Baburin (born 1959) - former Dean of Law
Herman Gref (born 1964) - Minister of Economic Development and Trade, CEO of Sberbank
Siman Povarenkin (born 1969) - businessman and owner of GeoProMining
Davaajantsangiin Sarangerel (born 1963) - Mongolian journalist and politician

References

External links
  Official 
  International Projects Department

 
Universities in Omsk Oblast
Omsk
Universities and institutes established in the Soviet Union
Educational institutions established in 1974
1974 establishments in Russia